The 2011–12 Vermont Catamounts men's basketball team represented the University of Vermont during the 2011–12 NCAA Division I men's basketball season. The Catamounts, led by first year head coach John Becker, played their home games at Patrick Gym and are members of the America East Conference. They finished the season 24–12, 13–3 in America East play to finish in second place. They were champions of the America East Basketball tournament and earned the conference's automatic bid into the 2012 NCAA tournament. They defeated Lamar in the First Four round before falling to North Carolina in the second round.

Roster

Schedule

|-
!colspan=9 style=| Exhibition

|-
!colspan=9 style=| Regular season

|-
!colspan=9 style=| America East tournament

|-
!colspan=9 style=| NCAA tournament

References

Vermont Catamounts men's basketball seasons
Vermont
Vermont
Cat
Cat